Sung Si-kyung (born April 17, 1979) is a South Korean singer, entertainer and television host. He debuted in 2001 and has released eight studio albums in Korean and two studio albums in Japanese. He has also hosted and appeared on numerous South Korean variety television shows including 2 Days & 1 Night, Witch Hunt, Non-Summit, Duet Song Festival, Vocal War: God's Voice, Battle Trip, The Voice Of Korea 2020, On & Off.

Career
Sung's comeback track "난 좋아" (Even Now) released on his 7th album debuted at number 5 on Billboard's Korea K-Pop Hot 100 for the week of September 22.

In 2019, Sung announced his first U.S. concert tour, a six-show trek across most major U.S. markets.

Sung released an English song "And We Go" in May 2020.

Discography

Korean albums 
 Like the First Time (2001)
 Melodie D'Amour (2002)
 Double Life; The Other Side (2003)
 I Want to Dream Again (2005)
 The Ballads (2006)
 Here in My Heart (2008)
 The First (2011)
 Siot (2021)

Japanese albums 
 Drama (2017)
 You Are Here (2018)
 You Can Change My Life (2021)

Filmography

Awards and nominations

Listicles

References

External links

 Official Japanese website

1979 births
Jellyfish Entertainment artists
K-pop singers
Korea University alumni
Living people
South Korean Buddhists
South Korean male television actors
MAMA Award winners
21st-century South Korean male  singers